Epley may refer to:

People with the surname
David Epley (1931–2009), minister who broadcast his weekly Christian TV show across the United States
Rebecca Epley, contestant in America's Next Top Model (season 4) aired in spring 2005

Places
Epley, Kentucky, an unincorporated community in Logan County, Kentucky, United States

See also
Epley maneuver, used to treat benign paroxysmal positional vertigo (BPPV) of the posterior or anterior canals
Dr. Frank W. Epley Office, house located in New Richmond, Wisconsin and on the National Register of Historic Places
Eple
Epperley
Eppley